Malavé or Malave is a surname. Notable people with the surname include: 

Alejandro González Malavé (1957–1986), Puerto Rican undercover agent
Ángel L. Malavé Zayas, Puerto Rican politician
Edwin Malave (born 1950), American boxer and  actor
Elías Malavé (born 1989), Venezuelan archer
José  Malavé (born 1971), Venezuelan baseball player
Martin Malave Dilan (born 1950), American politician
Omar Malavé (1963–2021), Venezuelan baseball player, coach and manager